Mount Saint Charles Academy is a private Roman Catholic coeducational junior/senior high school located in Woonsocket, Rhode Island, in the Roman Catholic Diocese of Providence.

History
In the late 1800s, a significant number of French Canadians migrated to the mill town of Woonsocket, RI. One local clergyman, Monsignor Charles Dauray, sought to preserve the French language and Catholic faith in the region through education. He invited the Brothers of the Sacred Heart, a French Catholic congregation, to staff a school in the city. Mount St. Charles Academy opened on September 14, 1924 to a number of boarders and commuting students. Br. Josephus, SC served as the first principal.

Three years after the completion of the school, Br. Josephus oversaw the construction of a gymnasium, the second largest in New England (Harvard University's being the only larger at the time). The early curriculum included a wide variety of courses emphasizing academic and athletic training. In 1963, the Br. Adelard Ice Hockey Arena, named after the "Father of Schoolboy Hockey" and the first built to serve a particular school, was added to the campus.

By the 1970s, with the closing of the all-girls' high school in the city, and a diminished interest in boarding schools, the Academy was modernized into a Grade 7–12 co-educational day school. By 2015, Mount Saint Charles had expanded and incorporated the 6th grade to compete with schools in the area.

It is accredited by the New England Association of Schools and Colleges and has been recognized twice as a Blue Ribbon School of Excellence by the U.S. Department of Education.

In 2009 it was announced that Mr. Herve Richer, Jr. would become the first lay president of Mount Saint Charles.  Mr. Edwin Burke, former assistant principal and advanced-placement European History teacher, assumed the position of Principal.

In March 2016, it was announced that the school would not take transgender students, including a statement in their handbook. Alumni of the school took to social media and created a petition to oppose this announcement. A student said that because the school is private and not public, it's up to the school to make their own choices. However, a parent of a different student said that it wasn't right to exclude kids because of how they identify. The school released a statement saying they did not mean to be discriminatory - the school's facilities couldn't accommodate transgender students. As of March 10, 2016, the school has rescinded the policy.

In 2017, Herve Richer stepped down as president. Alan Tenreiro, a 1992 graduate of the school, was selected as the third president of Mount Saint Charles Academy. Tenreiro was recently named National Principal of the Year for his role in transforming Cumberland High School into one of the most successful high schools in the state.

In 2019, the school received $3.7 million in Educational Institutional Revenue Bonds in order to create a new residence hall. The residence hall was opened that October to house 70 students for the first time in nearly 50 years.

Arts

Bands

The Music Department provides opportunities for students in grades 6 through 12 to participate in a long history of stage bands, jazz bands, brass choirs, woodwind, percussion and strings ensembles. The current format is a junior (high) band and for senior high one band, Symphonic Wind Ensemble. The department offers extracurricular bands ranging from Jazz to contemporary which play year-round. The senior high band participates in the Woonsocket Autumnfest Parade during the school year.

Chorus

The program in Chorus includes both junior high and high school students. Through a range of music styles including religious, musical theater and popular songs, students attempt to develop vocal and performance skills.

Dance

The Dance program includes modern, jazz, ballet and tap, through an academic and performance-based program. Students also gain experience in choreography and performance in different settings.

Excelsior Yearbook

The MSC yearbook publishes a complete and formal summary of each year's social, scholastic, athletic activities. It also contains individual pictures of all students and faculty. Although the teaching staff of the Academy and the respective senior classes are depicted in color print each year, the remainder of the student body is depicted in black and white.

Handbell Choirs

The Arts Department offers the opportunity to participate in handbell choirs performing at school concerts. The advanced group of Excelsior Bells also performs in the community on a regular basis.

Theater

Junior high and senior high programs offer theory, training and stage experiences during school hours. In addition, these theater classes schedule public performances.

Campus Ministry

In collaboration with the Religious Studies Department, the Office of Campus Ministry seeks to provide a range of experiences that form a more reflective faith community. To achieve this goal, the campus ministers guide and develop a range of activities - such as the Mission Drive, annual Christmas Baskets for the needy, and Days of Recollection - that involve the whole community in a variety of ways.

Athletics
The school is perhaps best known for its ice hockey program, which is considered to be one of the best in the United States. The Mount Saint Charles Academy boys' hockey team won twenty-six consecutive state titles from 1978 to 2003 and began a new streak with state victories in 2008, 2009, 2010, and 2011. Over the years, a total of 20 alumni have been drafted by the NHL. Brian Lawton and Bryan Berard were drafted 1st overall in the NHL Entry Draft. The story of this school's hockey program is recorded in the book Pride on the Mount by John Gillooly.  The current coach, Normand "Bill" Belisle, has a record of 990 wins, 183 losses, and 37 ties. In 2006, a documentary was created called Ice Kings, which encompasses the material covered in the book as well as insights from alumni and Coach Belisle.

In 2022, the boy's 18U hockey team won a National Championship.

In 2022, the boy's Varsity Lacrosse team was the first team in RIIL History to ever have won two back-to-back State Championships in 2 separate divisions (Division IV in '21 and Division II in '22).

In 2021, Mount St. Charles Hockey Academy was one of only two schools in the entire nation to have all 4 tournament bound teams (18U, 16U, 15O and 14U) qualify for their respective National Tournaments.

In addition, the girl's varsity tennis team has won several state championship titles, most recently in 2007 and 2008.

The school also won back to back Division II state titles in  boys soccer 2004 and 2005 before moving up to Division I in 2006.

The swim team also had a leap from Division III to Division I in one year, making it the first team in RIIL history to move two divisions in one year.

In 2015 the boy's varsity soccer team won the Division II state championship over Moses Brown.

Notable alumni

 Bryan Berard, ice hockey player
 Brian Boucher, ice hockey player
 Ed Bradley, journalist, 60 Minutes co-host (attended MSC)
 Jennifer Brien, radio host for WHJJ
 Keith Carney, ice hockey player
 Paul Guay, ice hockey
 Jeff Jillson, ice hockey player
 Brian Lawton, ice hockey player
 Johnny Martorano, number two to Whitey Bulger and known as "The Executioner" (graduated elsewehere, Milton High School) 
 Ben Mondor, owner of Boston Red Sox AAA affiliate, Pawtucket Red Sox
 Mathieu Schneider, ice hockey player
 Garth Snow, ice hockey player, General Manager of the New York Islanders
 Carl Betz, actor on The Donna Reed Show, Emmy Award winner for the television show Judd, for the Defense

See also

Catholic schools in the United States
Higher education
List of Rhode Island schools

References

External links

Educational institutions established in 1924
Private middle schools in Rhode Island
Catholic secondary schools in Rhode Island
Schools in Providence County, Rhode Island
Roman Catholic Diocese of Providence
Buildings and structures in Woonsocket, Rhode Island
1924 establishments in Rhode Island